Sunara is a both a given name and a surname. Notable people with the name include:

Hrvoje Sunara (born 1979), Croatian footballer and coach
Ivan Sunara (born 1959), Croatian basketball player
Sunara Begum (born 1984), English visual artist, filmmaker, photographer, and writer